Dimitri Tsyganov (born 18 February 1989) is a Russian professional ice hockey player. He played with HC Karlovy Vary in the Czech Extraliga during the 2010–11 Czech Extraliga season.

References

External links

1989 births
Russian ice hockey forwards
HC Karlovy Vary players
Living people
Sportspeople from Yekaterinburg
HC Vityaz players
Sportovní Klub Kadaň players
Sokol Krasnoyarsk players
THK Tver players
Titan Klin players
Molot-Prikamye Perm players
HC Chrudim players
HC CSK VVS Samara players
Avtomobilist Yekaterinburg players
Russian expatriate ice hockey people
Russian expatriate sportspeople in the Czech Republic
Expatriate ice hockey players in the Czech Republic